Southford Falls State Park is a public recreation area covering  in the towns of Oxford and Southbury, Connecticut. The state park offers fishing, hiking, waterfalls, a fire tower, and a covered bridge over Eight Mile Brook. It is managed by the Connecticut Department of Energy and Environmental Protection.

History
The fast flowing waters of Eight Mile Brook as it drops steeply from Lake Quassapaug to the Housatonic River provided power for an early industrial complex, which at one time included gristmills, sawmills, and the shops of iron workers, button makers, knife makers, clothiers and other skilled tradesmen. Evidence in the channel suggests that man-made improvements were introduced to strengthen the river's flow. At the turn of the 20th century, the Diamond Match Company bought up the site and built a factory for the manufacture of cardboard matchboxes. After the factory burned down for a second time, the site was ceded to the state in 1927. The state park was established in 1932.

Activities and amenities
The park's recreational features include hiking trails, picnicking facilities, skiing and ice-skating in winter, field sports, and fishing. It is a designated Trout Park, stocked weekly with trout from the state's fish hatcheries.

References

External links

Southford Falls State Park Connecticut Department of Energy and Environmental Protection
Southford Falls State Park Map Connecticut Department of Energy and Environmental Protection

State parks of Connecticut
Parks in New Haven County, Connecticut
Southbury, Connecticut
Oxford, Connecticut
Waterfalls of Connecticut
Protected areas established in 1932
Landforms of New Haven County, Connecticut